Grzegorz Edward Polkowski (born 31 October 1983) is a former Paralympic swimmer of Poland. At the 2004 Summer Paralympics he won a silver at 50m Freestyle S11 and at the 2008 Summer Paralympics he won a bronze at 100m Freestyle S11.

References 

1983 births
Living people
Swimmers from Warsaw
Polish male freestyle swimmers
Polish male backstroke swimmers
Swimmers at the 2004 Summer Paralympics
Swimmers at the 2008 Summer Paralympics
Swimmers at the 2012 Summer Paralympics
Medalists at the 2004 Summer Paralympics
Medalists at the 2008 Summer Paralympics
Paralympic silver medalists for Poland
Paralympic bronze medalists for Poland
S11-classified Paralympic swimmers
Paralympic swimmers of Poland
Paralympic medalists in swimming
Medalists at the World Para Swimming Championships
21st-century Polish people
20th-century Polish people